The 4th Central Executive Committee of the Chinese Communist Party (Chinese: 中国共产党第四届中央执行委员会) was in session from 1925 to 1927, and was the last central committee to have the term 'executive' in its title.  It was set into motion by the 4th National Congress of the Chinese Communist Party.  This would be followed by the 5th Central Committee of the Chinese Communist Party.

Its first plenary session elected the 4th Central Bureau of the Chinese Communist Party in 1925.  After this point, the Central Bureau was known as the Politburo.  It was most certainly preceded by the 3rd Central Executive Committee of the Chinese Communist Party.

Members
Chen Duxiu
Li Dazhao
Cai Hesen
Zhang Guotao
Xiang Ying
Qu Qiubai
Peng Shuzhi
Tan Pingshan
Li Weihan

Alternate Members
Deng Pei
Wang Hebo
Luo Zhanglong
Zhang Tailei
Zhu Jintang

External links
 4th Central Executive Committee of the CCP, People's Daily Online.

Central Committee of the Chinese Communist Party
1925 establishments in China
1927 disestablishments in China